This was the first edition of the tournament, Rogério Dutra Silva won the title defeating Horacio Zeballos in the final 7–5, 3–6, 7–5.

Seeds

Draw

Finals

Top half

Bottom half

References
 Main Draw
 Qualifying Draw

Santiago Challenger - Singles